Binzhou or Bin Prefecture was a zhou (prefecture) in imperial China centering around modern Binzhou, Shandong, China. It existed from 956 to 1913.

The current prefecture-level city of Binzhou, established in 1982, retains its name.

Geography
The administrative region of Bin Prefecture in the early Song dynasty is in modern northern Shandong. It probably includes parts of modern: 
Under the administration of Binzhou:
Binzhou
Boxing County
Under the administration of Dongying:
Lijin County

References
 

Prefectures of Later Zhou
Prefectures of the Song dynasty
Prefectures of the Yuan dynasty
Subprefectures of the Ming dynasty
Prefectures of the Jin dynasty (1115–1234)
Former prefectures in Shandong
Departments of the Qing dynasty